Agrupación Deportiva Ceuta was a Spanish football team based in the autonomous city of Ceuta. Founded in 1969 and dissolved in 1991, it held home matches at Estadio Alfonso Murube, with a capacity of 6,500.

History
From 1977 until 1991, Ceuta played 13 seasons in Segunda División B. The only exception was 1980–81, when the club competed in Segunda División, finishing 20th and last; on 7 September 1980, the first game in the category was played, a 2–0 home win against CD Málaga, one of 11 during the campaign (the top and the bottom-ranked teams were separated by only 16 points).

In summer 1991, following severe economic problems – which led to the club's relegation to Tercera División for not paying its players – Agrupación Deportiva folded, being replaced by AD Ceuta.

Club background
Agrupación Deportiva Ceuta (1969–91)

Other clubs from Ceuta
Ceuta Sport Club — (1932-56); renamed in 1941 to Sociedad Deportiva Ceuta
Sociedad Deportiva Ceuta — (1941-56); in 1956 merged with the Spanish elements of Club Atlético Tetuán to form Club Atlético de Ceuta
Club Atlético de Ceuta — (1956–); renamed in 2013 to Agrupación Deportiva Ceuta Fútbol Club
Club Deportivo Imperio de Ceuta — (1958–)
Club Ceutí Atlético (1996–97)
Asociación Deportiva Ceuta (1997–2012)
Agrupación Deportiva Ceuta Fútbol Club — (2013–)

Season to season

1 season in Segunda División
13 seasons in Segunda División B
7 seasons in Tercera División

Selected former players
 Claudio Barragán

Football clubs in Ceuta
Association football clubs established in 1970
Association football clubs disestablished in 1991
Defunct football clubs in Spain
1970 establishments in Spain
1991 disestablishments in Spain
Segunda División clubs